Revathi Veeramani is an Indian athlete from Tamil Nadu . She has been selected for representing India at the 2020 Summer Olympics at the event of Mixed 4 × 400m Relay.

See also 
 India at the 2020 Summer Olympics

References

1997 births
Living people
Indian female sprinters
 Athletes (track and field) at the 2020 Summer Olympics
 Olympic athletes of India